Astrothelium pseudoferrugineum is a species of corticolous (bark-dwelling), crustose lichen in the family Trypetheliaceae. Found in Indonesia, it was formally described as a new species in 2016 by Dutch lichenologist André Aptroot. The type specimen was collected in 1937 by Pieter Groenhart on Jombang (Java); there, it was found in a disturbed rainforest growing on smooth tree bark. The lichen has a smooth and somewhat shiny to glossy, bright orange thallus with a cortex but without a prothallus. The use of thin-layer chromatography shows the lichen contains an orange anthraquinone, possibly parietin. It is named for its similarity to Astrothelium ferrugineum, from which it differs in its glossier thallus and larger ascospores (measuring 28–31 by 9–11 μm).

References

pseudoferrugineum
Lichen species
Lichens described in 2016
Lichens of Malesia
Taxa named by André Aptroot